Vigen (in Western Armenian Վիգէն, pronounced Viken), is an Armenian masculine given name.

Vigen or Viken may refer to:

People
Given name
Vicken Cheterian, Swiss–Lebanese journalist and author
Viken Berberian, American satirist
Viken Babikian, American doctor of Armenian origin
Vigen Chaldranyan (born 1955), Armenian actor and filmmaker
Vigen Derderian (1929–2003), Iranian singer and actor of Armenian descent, popularly known by the mononym Viguen
Vigen Sargsyan (born 1975), Armenian politician, and Armenian government minister

Middle name
Lasse Vigen Christensen (born 1994), Danish football player
Ola Vigen Hattestad (born 1982), Norwegian skier

Other uses
Le Vigen, a commune in France
Vigen Cliffs, Antarctica
Terje Vigen, a poem by Henrik Ibsen

See also
Viken (surname)

Armenian masculine given names